C.O.D. was an American electro musician (real name was Raul A. Rodriguez), who had a hit with In the Bottle which was released on Emergency Records and written by Gil-Scot Heron in 1983. The track reached #54 in the UK Singles Chart in May 1983.

Rodriguez was a DJ, notable for a residency at the nightclub New York-New York, and a remixer in the New York disco scene. As well as working his own projects he produced the Man Parrish hit "Hip Hop, Be Bop (Don’t Stop)."

In 1985, his electro version of Frederick Knights's "Uphill (Peace of Mind)" was featured in the climactic dance-club scene in Michael Cimino's Year of the Dragon.

One of Raul's biggest remixes was of ABBA's "Lay All Your Love On Me" in 1980. Due to its popularity on the U.S. Hot Dance Club Play chart, ABBA decided to release their album version as a 12-inch single.
Raul died on 4 January 2012 as the result of a severe stroke.

Discography

Singles
 1983: "In the Bottle" (US Emergency Records EMDS 6535)
 1983: "In the Bottle" (UK Streetwave WAVE 2)
 1984: "Uphill (Piece of Mind)" (US Emergency Records EMDS 6545)
 1984: "Uphill (Piece of Mind)" (UK Streetwave MKHAN 22)

References

American electronic musicians
American dance musicians
Club DJs
Remixers
2012 deaths
American electro musicians
Year of birth missing